Kannukkul Nilavu is a 2000 Indian Tamil-language romantic thriller film written and directed by Fazil. The film stars Vijay, Shalini and Kaveri, while Raghuvaran, Srividya and Ponvannan play other supporting roles. It was Vijay's 25th film and his first film of the new 2000s millennium. The film was released on 14 January 2000 to positive reviews and was a decent hit. Its satellite rights were sold to Sun TV for a good price. Apart from praise for its suspenseful story and Vijay's performance the songs "Oru Naal Oru Kanavu" and "Iravu Pagalai Theda" were popular hit songs in the 2000s.

Plot 
The film is about a young man who suffers from a neurological condition that results in partial retrograde amnesia and delusions due to a head injury and his subsequent recovery thanks to a kind woman and her psychiatrist father.

The film opens to Gautham Prabhakar searching all around Pondicherry in vain for a girl named Gayathri. He encounters a group of friends headed by Hema and requests their help in locating Gayathri, who appears to be Gautham's lover. The group members are initially hostile to him but eventually decide to help him after Gautham pursues them aggressively and Hema realizes that he may be suffering from a neurological condition resulting in amnesia and delusions. Hema's father Dr. Rajashekar is a psychiatrist who discovers Gautham's real condition and the dangers it poses.

It is revealed that Gautham was actually a musicologist. About six months earlier, he had traveled to a hill resort in Tamil Nadu for his research on musical patterns in the sounds of nature. While in that trip, he encountered three men - Prakash, Soundar, and Shanmugam - who all hailed from Pondicherry. Gayathri was a local girl who was teased frequently by the three men. Gayathri regularly ran up to Gautham to seek refuge from the men's pursuits. Then, one day, the three men got drunk and began molesting Gayathri. Hearing her screams, Gautham and his friend Balaji attempted to rescue Gayathri. In the ensuing fight, Balaji's knee was struck with an axe, Gayathri dropped unconscious, and Gautham was hit hard on the head with the blunt end of the axe. The way Gautham remembers it is - the three men had molested and murdered Gayathri and then had left Gautham for dead after striking him on the head. Gautham, in his hypnotic state, swears furiously to Rajashekar that he will avenge Gayathri's murder by capturing and killing the three men responsible. As it is revealed later in the film, Gayathri had not died but had merely passed out.

Rajasekhar explains to Hema and her friends the reason why Gautham kept viewing Gayathri as his lover in his delusional state, even though she actually had no relationship with Gautham and he was merely trying to be a Good Samaritan. He also explains that if Gautham was treated and his memories brought back, then it could potentially create a new Gautham, a violent and aggressive one, who goes on a killing spree. Unable to make a decision on the next step forward, on Hema's suggestion, they decide to delay any action until Gautham's mother arrived from Malaysia. It is revealed through intermittent scenes that the mother, having not had contact with her son in all of the previous six months, is already out of her home, searching desperately for her son in India.

Until the mother arrived, the kind Hema takes care of Gautham. Gautham, for unknown reasons, becomes fond of Hema and believes deeply that Hema is the only person who can help him, and in return Hema also begins to develop feelings of affection and love towards him. Hema even wonders if it would be possible to bring Gautham back to normal by showing him enough care and affection that he forgets about Gayathri altogether. This strategy fails, as once the mother arrives, Gautham's past memories come flooding back to him and he turns into a reckless revenge-seeker, terrorizing both his mother and Hema, and swearing to kill the three men who had supposedly murdered Gayathri.

The remainder of the film is about how Hema and Gautham's mother put up with the new villainous Gautham, while Rajashekar devises and implements an ingenious plan to cure him. Rajashekar manages to contact the three men, who reveal the truth - Gayathri was still alive. The three men are innocent, and the only terrible mistake they had done was drunkenly striking Gautham on the head, resulting in this whole mess. While Gautham manages to capture Prakash and Soundar for his revenge, Rajashekar and Shanmugam manage to trick him successfully into entering Gayathri's current home by giving him a chase. Gautham is initially dumbstruck at seeing Gayathri still alive, but then reality eventually sinks into him, and he is cured completely. He apologizes to his mother, Shanmugam, and Hema for his torturous acts, reveals the location where he held the other two men captive, and profusely thanks Rajashekar and Hema for their efforts. Hema looks on sadly as she wonders if this is the last she would see of him. Rajashekar senses this and gives a non-verbal consent for Gautham to take his daughter with him. Hema is overjoyed and the two, along with Gautham's mother, drive back.

Cast

Production
Mohan Natarajan brought together the team of the successful 1997 film, Kadhalukku Mariyadhai, in director Fazil and leading pair Vijay and Shalini with the venture. Filming began in July 1999, after Vijay eventually completed the shooting for his previous romantic comedy Minsara Kanna (1999). Anandakuttan was signed on to handle the camera and Ilaiyaraja to compose the music, while K. R. Gowrishankar and T. R. Sekar took charge of the editing, while the art direction was handled by Mani Suchitra. The filming took place in and around Chennai, Pondicherry, Krishnapatnam Harbour, Vizag Harbour, Tuticorin Harbour, Alappuzha, Kochi and the hilly area of Wagamon.

Release
The film was released on 14 January 2000. Kannukkul Nilavu opened to positive reviews with The Hindu claiming that it was a "tremendous comeback vehicle for Vijay, wherein he portrays an entire gamut of emotions". The reviewer added that the film was "subtle in scenic presentation and characterisation, suspense without melodrama and spontaneity in reactions are plusses", while mentioning that Shalini was "flawless" in her role. Rediff.com described it as a "film worth seeing", labelling that "the highlight of the film is actor Vijay's power-packed performance". The critic described that the "actor has shown laudable skill both in the way he has handled this complicated role and in expressing various shades of Gautham's tormented mind. Especially from the moment he becomes aggressive, with the violent streak predominating and eyes blazing with manic fury." K. N. Vijiyan of New Straits Times noted that the film "offers something different from usual love stories and should appease Vijay's fans". Ananda Vikatan rated the film 40 out of 100.

Cinematographer Ananda Kuttan and Stunt Coordinator Stun Siva won the Tamil Nadu State Film Award for Best Cinematographer and Tamil Nadu State Film Award for Best Stunt Coordinator for their works in the film respectively.

Soundtrack
The film's score and soundtrack were composed by Ilaiyaraaja, while the lyrics were written by Palani Bharathi. Although he did not sing any of the songs in this film, Vijay did playback sing brief snippets of "Iravu Pagalai Theda" and "Chinnanchiru Kiliye" in two scenes.

References

External links
 

2000 films
Films scored by Ilaiyaraaja
Films directed by Fazil
2000s Tamil-language films
Indian psychological thriller films
Films about amnesia